Marodian is a rural locality in the Fraser Coast Region, Queensland, Australia.

History 
The locality takes its name from the parish name, which in turn is derived from the name of a pastoral run held by James and Norman Leith Hay in 1852. The pastoral run name might come from the Kabi language word maridhan meaning place of kangaroos.

References 

Fraser Coast Region
Localities in Queensland